Helmontia is a genus of flowering plants belonging to the family Cucurbitaceae.

Its native range is from northern South America to northern Brazil. It is found in the countries of Brazil, French Guiana, Guyana, Suriname and Venezuela.

The genus name of Helmontia is in honour of Jan Baptist van Helmont (1580–1644), a chemist, physiologist, and physician from the Spanish Netherlands. It was first described and published in Bull. Soc. Roy. Bot. Belgique Vol.14 on page 239 in 1875.

Known species, according to Kew:
Helmontia cardiophylla 
Helmontia leptantha 
Helmontia trujilloi

References

Cucurbitaceae
Cucurbitaceae genera
Plants described in 1875
Flora of South America
Taxa named by Alfred Cogniaux